Turlock–Denair station is an Amtrak intercity rail station in Denair, California, which also serves the nearby larger town of Turlock. The station is served by the seven daily round trips of the San Joaquins.

The growth of Turlock and Denair was bolstered by rival railroads. Turlock was established by the Southern Pacific Railroad as it built through the area in the early 1870s. A few decades later, the Atchison, Topeka and Santa Fe Railway constructed a line roughly three miles to the east, and the town of Denair developed along the tracks. Amtrak chose to use the Santa Fe tracks when the San Joaquin service was established in 1974. Denair (later called Turlock–Denair) was added as a stop on September 8, 1987.

References

External links

Railway stations in Stanislaus County, California
Amtrak stations in California
Railway stations in the United States opened in 1987